Rochford is a locality in the Macedon Ranges Shire, in Victoria, Australia, on the Lancefield-Woodend Road (now signposted as the Rochford Road).

The district once contained a number of public and religious buildings, all of which now appear to have been removed or demolished. These included a Public Hall, Anglican Church, Presbyterian Church, and tennis courts.

Rochford Post Office opened on 10 March 1863 and closed in 1965.

The 1857 red brick building & former 1870 principal's residence of the former Rochford North School (State School 540) is still standing and is now a privately owned luxury holiday rental.

References

Towns in Victoria (Australia)
Shire of Macedon Ranges
1863 establishments in Australia